The 2015 Cavan Minor Football Championship was played between August and October 2015. It is the premier minor championship in Cavan. 8 teams took part − 6 clubs - Ramor United, Laragh United, Crosserlough, Cavan Gaels, Castlerahan and Knockbride - as well as two amalgamated teams - Southern Gaels (Gowna/Lacken) and St. Joseph's (Arva, Killeshandea and Drumlane).

Ramor United GFC competed in their third final in a row against Laragh United GFC in the final, winning by 1-09 to 1-07 in a replay. The first game was played before the Cavan Senior Football Championship final between Castlerahan and Kingscourt and finished Ramor 1-08 Laragh 0-11.

Teams
6 clubs - Ramor United, Laragh United, Crosserlough, Cavan Gaels, Castlerahan and Knockbride - as well as two amalgamated teams - Southern Gaels (Gowna/Lacken) and St. Joseph's (Arva, Killeshandea and Drumlane). The teams for the 2015 Championship was decided by the top six teams in the Lakeside Manor Hotel Minor Football League Division 1 (Southern Gaels, St Josephs, Ramor, Crosserlough, Castlerahan and Cavan Gaels) and the top two teams in the Lakeside Manor Hotel Minor Football League Division 2 (Knockbride and Laragh).

Format
The eight teams were drawn against each other in Round 1. The 4 winners were then drawn against each other (Round 2A) as were the 4 losers (Round 2B). The winners of the Round 2A games progressed to the semi-final and the losers entered Round 3. The winners of the Round 2B games progressed to Round 3 and the losers of Round 2B were eliminated. The winners of the Round 3 games joined the winners of Round 2A games in the semi-final.

References

Cavan Minor Football Championship
Cavan GAA Football championships